I-502 may refer to:

 
 Washington Initiative 502